Hisham Fageeh (Arabic: هشام فقيه; born October 26, 1987) is a comedian and actor from Saudi Arabia.

Early life
Fageeh was born in Riyadh, Saudi Arabia.

Career 
Fageeh co-produced and starred in Saudi Arabia's submission to the Oscars for 2016's Best Foreign Film, Barakah Meets Barakah. His work has been written about by The New York Times, Vanity Fair, Rolling Stone, BBC, Variety, among others. Most-known for his 2013 viral video "No Woman, No Drive" which amassed more than 17 million views, Hisham started performing stand-up while working on Capitol Hill in Washington, DC.

During his Master's at Columbia University, he studied improvisational comedy at the Upright Citizens Brigade Theater (UCBT). He started a web series (Hisham's Weeklies) before doing stand-up in Saudi Arabia. Within a year Fageeh was taking the stage with comedians Dean Obeidallah, Maysoon Zayid, Aasif Mandvi, Aron Kader, and Hari Kondabolu. He began performing in Arabic after his satirical blog YouTube series "Isboo'iyat Hisham" (Hisham's Weeklies) went viral in December 2011, he joined the ranks of Fahad Albutairi and Bader Saleh in the Saudi stand-up circuits.

Fageeh is said to be as the first Saudi to perform in Gotham Theater and headline an Arabic stand-up comedy tour in the United States and England. He was previously Head of Content at Telfaz11, a multi-channel network with 12 million subscribers and more than one billion views. Fageeh was a featured performer in the 2012 New York Arab-American Comedy Festival, both in the "New Faces" and "Haram night" shows.  Fageeh is known for his report from New York for La Yekthar. This segment of La Yekthar has been covered by the BBC and the GlobalPost.

Personal life 
Fageeh is married to a woman from Saudi Arabia. They met on Twitter and had to go to Bahrain to date.

Filmography

References

Saudi Arabian male comedians
American people of Saudi Arabian descent
1987 births
Living people
People from Riyadh